"Lass uns tanzen" ("Let's dance") is a song by German band Scooter. It was released on 26 March 2007, as the second and last single from their twelfth studio album The Ultimate Aural Orgasm.

Track listing
CD single
"Lass uns tanzen" (Radio Edit) – (3:43)
"Lass uns tanzen" (Alternative Club Mix) – (5:22)
"Lass uns tanzen" (DJ Zany Remix) – (6:38)
"Te quiero" – (6:25)

12" vinyl
"Lass uns tanzen" (DJ Zany Remix) – (6:38)
"Lass uns tanzen" (Extended Mix) – (4:52)
"Lass uns tanzen" (Tom Novy´s New HP Invent Mix) – (6:43)
"Lass uns tanzen" (Hardwell & Greatski Late At Night Remix) – (6:34)

Digital download
"Lass uns tanzen" (Radio Edit) – (3:43)
"Lass uns tanzen" (Alternative Club Mix) – (5:22)
"Lass uns tanzen" (DJ Zany Remix) – (6:38)
"Te quiero" – (6:25)
"Lass uns tanzen" (Tom Novy´s New HP Invent Mix) – (6:43)

Notes
"Lass uns tanzen" samples the song "Disco Band" by the Italo disco group Scotch. "Lass uns tanzen" was later used as the basis for the Scooter remixes of Lützenkirchen's "3 Tage Wach" (in 2008) and Rammstein's "Pussy" (in 2009). In 2009 it was once again used in the band's cover of Die Fantastischen Vier's "Troy" for the tribute album A Tribute To Die Fantastischen Vier.
The song has only one lyric: "Lass uns tanzen oder ficken oder beides, denn morgen sind wir tot". The line is repeated a multitude of times throughout the song, sometimes in a different order. The line translates to "Let us dance or fuck or both, for tomorrow we will be dead."
There are two versions of the song. The radio version, also known as the "Day Version", censors the word "ficken". The "Night Version" is in fact the album version, and leaves the word uncensored.

Charts

References

Scooter (band) songs
2007 singles
Songs written by H.P. Baxxter
Songs written by Rick J. Jordan
German-language songs
2007 songs
Songs written by Jens Thele
Songs written by Michael Simon (DJ)